Jordan Elisabeth Baggett (born October 28, 1996) is an American professional soccer player who plays as a midfielder for Washington Spirit of the National Women's Soccer League (NWSL). Baggett played college soccer for the Stanford Cardinal.

Early life

Stanford University, 2015–2018
During her freshman season at Stanford, Baggett started all 23 games in the midfield. She scored the game-winning goal against USC to clinch the Pac-12 title. Baggett was named to the Pac-12 All-Freshman Team. In her sophomore season she played in 20 games and scored 7 goals.

Baggett started all 25 games in her junior year. She scored 9 goals, 6 of which were game winners. She scored the only 2 goals in Stanford's 2–0 win over South Carolina in the College Cup semi-final. Stanford won the 2017 College Cup and Baggett was named to the College Cup All-Tournament team and the All-Pac-12 second team. Baggett was named team captain in her senior season with Stanford. She was named 2018 Pac-12 Midfielder of the Year and was a finalist for the Hermann Trophy, her Stanford teammate Catarina Macario won the award.

Club career

Washington Spirit, 2019–present
At the 2019 NWSL College Draft the Washington Spirit traded three players and a fourth round draft pick to Sky Blue FC to acquire the 3rd overall pick in the draft. The Spirit used this draft pick to select Baggett. On March 4, 2019, Washington announced that Baggett had signed a contract with the club.

International career
Baggett is a United States youth international at the U20 and U23 levels.

Baggett received her first call-up to the United States women's national soccer team in December 2019.

Personal life
Formerly Jordan DiBiasi, she married Ben Baggett, a former Stanford baseball player, in January 2022, and began playing under her married name.

Honors
Stanford Cardinal
 Women's College Cup: 2017

Washington Spirit
 NWSL Championship: 2021

References

External links
Jordan DiBiasi - Women's Soccer
Jordan Baggett » Washington Spirit

1996 births
Living people
American women's soccer players
Stanford Cardinal women's soccer players
United States women's under-20 international soccer players
People from Highlands Ranch, Colorado
Soccer players from Colorado
Women's association football midfielders
Washington Spirit draft picks
Washington Spirit players
National Women's Soccer League players